Arnhold and S. Bleichroeder was a New York-based investment bank that remained as a fund management company under the control of the Kellen and Arnhold families until December 2015, when majority ownership was sold to the Blackstone Group LP and Corsair Capital LLC, led by Simpson Thacher & Bartlett. The core constituent was of a merger between the banking firm of S. Bleichröder, founded by Samuel Bleichröder in 1803 in Berlin, and the banking firm of Gebr. Arnhold (Arnhold Brothers) founded in Dresden in 1864 which acquired S. Bleichroeder in 1931.

History
In the mid-19th century, S. Bleichröder achieved international prominence under the leadership of Samuel's eldest son, Gerson von Bleichröder. Amongst other activities he managed the private banking transactions of Otto von Bismarck and with the transfer of credits and/or placing of loans on behalf of the Prussian state and the German Empire. He was also a partner at the investment bank of the New York investment bank Ladenburg Thalmann.

The other component of the current firm was Gebr. Arnhold (Arnhold Brothers) founded in 1864 in Dresden. This was the banking firm of the Arnhold family, which also had major industrial interests in Germany. Gebr. Arnhold established an office in Berlin in 1912, and after World War I became active in London, Zurich, and New York.

In 1931, Gebr. Arnhold acquired S. Bleichröder. With the rise of Nazi persecution the firm’s activities were moved to New York City in 1937 and conducted business under the name of Arnhold and S. Bleichroeder, Inc.

In 1939, the firm's name was changed to Arnhold and S. Bleichroeder.

In 1967, it launched first offshore fund under the First Eagle name.

In 1987 launched first U.S. registered mutual fund, the First Eagle Fund of America, with Michael Max Kellen as the portfolio manager, who subsequently became Vice Chairman and Co-CEO of Arnhold and S. Bleichroeder Holdings.

In 2002, Natexis Banques Populaires, the investment banking arm of Banque Populaire, a French mutual bank, purchased the brokerage business of Arnhold & S Bleichroeder for $105 million. The broker's existing shareholders received a 2.6% stake in Natexis, and the company was renamed Natexis Bleichroeder. The asset management business, Arnhold & S Bleichroeder Advisors, was not part of the deal and continued to be operated through its parent, A&SB. Subsequently, Arnhold and S. Bleichroeder Advisers was renamed First Eagle Investment Management, and as of Sept 2010, it held approximately US-$45 billion in assets under management according to its web site,.

In 2007, TA Associates bought a minority stake in First Eagle Investment Management from descendants of the founding family. TA Associates brought into First Eagle a professional CEO from the asset management industry, Bridget Macaskill, formerly CEO of Oppenheim.

In December 2015, Blackstone and Corsair Capital bought majority control of the firm from TA Associates and descendants of the founding family.

Notable employees and alumni
  re-established Arnhold and S. Bleichroeder, Inc. in 1937 in New York, and hired his son-in-law, Stephen Max Kellen, as CEO in 1940. His daughter, Anna-Maria Arnhold, married Stephen Kellen.
He led the firm as President and CEO for nearly 60 years, hiring Walter Oechsle in the 1950s and then personally hiring George Soros in the 1960s to run its investment funds, and leading the firm's participation in many leading trans Atlantic deals of the time.
 Bruce Greenwald, joined the firm in 2009 as Director of Research; after ten years, he retired and remains a Senior Advisor.
 Henry H. Arnhold joined Arnhold in the 1960s in a non-executive role and became non-executive chairman of the bank after the death of Stephen Kellen.
 Jim Rogers, joined the firm in 1970 and left in 1973 to form the Quantum Fund with Soros reportedly because new brokerage firm regulation prevented them from getting a percentage of profits.
 George Soros, worked there from 1963–1973.

References

External links
 Arnhold and S. Bleichroeder Advisers
 Literature on an about Gerson Bleichröder in the catalog of the DDB

Archives and records
Bleichröder Bank collection at Baker Library Special Collections, Harvard Business School.

Investment banks
Banks based in New York (state)